Stayfree is an American brand of feminine hygiene products, including maxi pads, ultra thin pads, and female wipes. On July 31, 2013, Energizer bought Stayfree from Johnson & Johnson. The purchase was only for the brands in North America – Johnson & Johnson continues to own the brands in all other regions of the world.

Products 
 Stayfree® Ultra Thin Regular
 Stayfree® Ultra Thin Regular with Wings
 Stayfree® Ultra Thin Super Long with Wings
 Stayfree® Ultra Thin Overnight with Wings
 Stayfree® Maxi Regular
 Stayfree® Maxi Deodorant
 Stayfree® Maxi Super
 Stayfree® Maxi Super Long
 Stayfree® Maxi Regular with Wings
 Stayfree® Maxi Super Long with Wings
 Stayfree® Maxi Overnight with Wings

References

External links
Official website

Feminine hygiene brands
Edgewell Personal Care